The 2019 World Men's Curling Championship (branded as the 2019 Pioneer Hi-Bred World Men's Curling Championship for sponsorship reasons) was held from March 30 to April 7 at the ENMAX Centre in Lethbridge, Alberta, Canada.

Qualification
The following nations are qualified to participate in the 2019 World Men's Curling Championship:
 (host country)
One team from the 2018 Americas Challenge

Seven teams from the 2018 European Curling Championships

Two teams from the 2018 Pacific-Asia Curling Championships

Two teams from the 2019 World Qualification Event

Notes

Teams
The teams are as follows:

WCT ranking
Year to date World Curling Tour order of merit ranking for each team prior to the event.

Round-robin standings
Final round-robin standings

Round-robin results
All draw times are listed in Mountain Time (UTC-06:00).

Draw 1
Saturday, March 30, 14:00

Draw 2
Saturday, March 30, 19:00

Draw 3
Sunday, March 31, 09:00

Draw 4
Sunday, March 31, 14:00

Draw 5
Sunday, March 31, 19:00

Draw 6
Monday, April 1, 09:00

Draw 7
Monday, April 1, 14:00

Draw 8
Monday, April 1, 19:00

Draw 9
Tuesday, April 2, 09:00

Draw 10
Tuesday, April 2, 14:00

Draw 11
Tuesday, April 2, 19:00

Draw 12
Wednesday, April 3, 09:00

Draw 13
Wednesday, April 3, 14:00

Draw 14
Wednesday, April 3, 19:00

Draw 15
Thursday, April 4, 09:00

Draw 16
Thursday, April 4, 14:00

Draw 17
Thursday, April 4, 19:00

Draw 18
Friday, April 5, 09:00

Draw 19
Friday, April 5, 14:00

Draw 20
Friday, April 5, 19:00

Playoffs

Qualification games 
Saturday, April 6, 09:00

Semifinal 1 
Saturday, April 6, 14:00

Semifinal 2 
Saturday, April 6, 19:00

Bronze medal game 
Sunday, April 7, 12:00

Final 
Sunday, April 7, 17:00

Final standings

Statistics

Top 5 player percentages
Final round robin percentages; minimum 9 games

Perfect games

Awards
The awards and all-star team are as follows:

All-Star Team
Skip:  Niklas Edin, Sweden
Third:  Oskar Eriksson, Sweden
Second:  Yasumasa Tanida, Japan
Lead:  Ben Hebert, Canada

Collie Campbell Memorial Award
 Kim Soo-hyuk, South Korea

References
General

Specific

External links

2019 in Canadian curling
World Men's Curling Championship
International curling competitions hosted by Canada
Curling in Alberta
2019 in Alberta
Sport in Lethbridge
World Men's Curling Championship
World Men's Curling Championship